The 1964–65 British Ice Hockey season featured a Scottish League but there was no league structure in England for the fifth consecutive year. Durham Wasps competed in the Scottish League.

University Match
Oxford University defeated Cambridge University 3-1 at the Richmond Ice Rink.

Scottish League

Regular season

Group A

Group B

Final
Fife Flyers 4 - Paisley Mohawks 6

References

British
1964 in English sport
1965 in English sport
1964 in Scottish sport
1965 in Scottish sport